The BrakeBest Select 159 presented by O'Reilly, also known as the BrakeBest Brake Pads 159, was a NASCAR Camping World Truck Series race held at the Daytona International Speedway infield road course in Daytona Beach, Florida. Originally created in 2020 as a temporary event in response to races canceled by the COVID-19 pandemic, the race returned in 2021 for the same reason. The race didn’t return to the schedule in 2022 

Ben Rhodes is the last race winner of the race. The race ran in support of the NASCAR Cup Series' O'Reilly Auto Parts 253

History

The Daytona infield road course, which includes parts of the  speedway oval, is most notably used for the 24 Hours of Daytona sports car race and Daytona 200 motorcycle race. In March 2020, NASCAR announced the NASCAR Cup Series' Busch Clash exhibition race would use the road course rather than the oval starting in 2021.

Prior to schedule changes in response to the COVID-19 pandemic, the Chevrolet Silverado 250 at Canadian Tire Motorsport Park served as the Truck Series' lone road course race; due to the pandemic, it was canceled in July. A new race on the Daytona road course was organized, which officially replaced the also-canceled event at Iowa Speedway. Known as the Sunoco 159, it was the first leg of the Triple Truck Challenge that provided monetary rewards for the winner. Although much of the road course layout remained the same as the sports car configuration, NASCAR added a frontstretch chicane exiting the oval's turn four to allow trucks to slow down entering the braking-heavy turn one. Sheldon Creed, driving a Chevrolet, won the inaugural event in 2020, his second victory of the season to that point.

While the event was intended to be just a temporary race for 2020, it returned in 2021 after the Cup and Xfinity Series races at Auto Club Speedway were canceled due to concerns related to COVID-19. Although the Trucks did not have an Auto Club race, their round at Homestead–Miami Speedway was replaced for logistics reasons as the Homestead weekend was moved back one week in order to keep the teams in Daytona a second consecutive week. The race became one of four Truck road course events, the most in series history. O'Reilly Auto Parts became the title sponsor for the weekend's races, which renamed the Truck event to the BrakeBest Select 159. Ben Rhodes won after holding off Creed on three overtime starts; the race began under "wet" conditions due to rain before the start, which allowed teams to strategize when to switch from rain tires to dry-weather racing slicks.

The race was not renewed for 2022.

Past winners

Notes
 2020 & 2021: Race extended due to NASCAR overtime.

Manufacturer wins

See also
 Super Start Batteries 188

References

External links
 

2020 establishments in Florida
 
NASCAR Truck Series races
Recurring sporting events established in 2020
Annual sporting events in the United States